{{Taxobox
| name = Cardiobacterium hominis
| image = Cardiobacterium hominis.jpg
| image_caption = Cardiobacterium hominis on blood agar plate
| domain = Bacteria
| phylum = Pseudomonadota
| classis = Gammaproteobacteria
| ordo = Cardiobacteriales
| familia = Cardiobacteriaceae
| genus = Cardiobacterium
| species = C. hominis
}}Cardiobacterium hominis is a Gram-negative bacillus (rod-shaped) bacterium  commonly grouped with other bacteria into the HACEK group. It is one of several bacteria that is normally present in the mouth and upper part of the respiratory tract such as nose and throat. However, it may also rarely cause endocarditis, an infection of the heart valves.

MicrobiologyC. hominis is a catalase-negative, oxidase-positive, indole-producing, Gram-negative rod. Its morphology has classically been described as highly pleomorphic and irregularly staining, although homogeneous bacilli with uniform shapes may be seen with the addition of yeast extract.

Antibiotic sensitivity
Historically, C. hominis has been sensitive to penicillin and penicillin derivatives such as ampicillin. However, penicillin-resistant strains, including those that produce beta-lactamases, have been described with increasing frequency. Clinical guidelines thus recommend that C. hominis and other HACEK organisms be presumed to harbor ampicillin resistance and therefore be treated with a third-generation cephalosporin. C. hominis and other HACEK organisms also exhibit in vitro susceptibility to trimethoprim-sulfamethoxazole, fluoroquinolones, and aztreonam. C. hominis is often resistant to erythromycin. Since cefotaxime use may be not appropriate for C. hominis'' endocarditis, an alternative regimen might include association of co-amoxiclav and gentamicin.

References

External links
  Image: Cardibacterium hominins
Type strain of Cardiobacterium hominis at BacDive -  the Bacterial Diversity Metadatabase

Gram-negative bacteria
Gammaproteobacteria